Sukh Ram Chaudhary is an Indian politician and is the current MLA for the Paonta Sahib in the Himachal Pradesh Legislative Assembly since 2017.

Chaudhary, a having a Diploma in eletrical was elected to the Himachal Legislative Assembly in 2003, 2007 and 2017. Chaudhary is also serving as power minister since 2017.

References 

Himachal Pradesh MLAs 2003–2007
Himachal Pradesh MLAs 2007–2012
Himachal Pradesh MLAs 2017–2022
Himachal Pradesh MLAs 2022–2027
1964 births
Living people